Pyroneura is an Indomalayan genus of grass skipper butterflies in the family Hesperiidae.

Species
Pyroneura toshikoae H. Hayashi, 1980
Pyroneura helena  (Butler, 1870) Sumatra, Malaya, Borneo
Pyroneura natuna   (Fruhstorfer, 1909) Thailand, Langkawi, Peninsular Malaya, Borneo, Natuna
Pyroneura flavia   (Staudinger, 1889) Thailand, Langkawi, Malaysia, Borneo, Sumatra, Java, Bali
Pyroneura latoia   (Hewitson, 1868) Malaya, Burma, Thailand, Langkawi, Singapore, Borneo, Sumatra, Lingga, Batoe, Java
Pyroneura klanga   (Evans, 1941) Malaya, Thailand
Pyroneura derna   (Evans, 1941) Burma, Thailand, Malaysia, Tioman, Borneo, Simeulue, Siberut, Sumatra, Palawan
Pyroneura niasana   (Fruhstorfer, 1909) Assam, Burma, Thailand, Langkawi, Malaya, Borneo, Sumatra, Palawan
Pyroneura agnesia   (Eliot, 1967) Malaya, Brunei
Pyroneura perakana   (Evans, 1926) Malaya, Thailand
Pyroneura aurantiaca   (Elwes & Edwards, 1897) Malaya, Java
Pyroneura margherita   (Doherty, 1889) Vietnam, Burma, Thailand, Laos
Pyroneura callineura   (C. & R. Felder, [1867]) Malaya, Borneo, Java, Sumatra
Pyroneura vermiculata   (Hewitson, 1878) Sumatra
Pyroneura liburnia   (Hewitson, 1868) Philippines

References

Natural History Museum Lepidoptera genus database
Pyroneura Eliot in Corbet & Pendlebury, 1978 at Markku Savela's Lepidoptera and Some Other Life Forms

Hesperiinae
Hesperiidae genera